Lysiloma is a genus of flowering plants in the family Fabaceae.

The genus is native to the Americas, and species range from Arizona and New Mexico through Mexico and Central America to Costa Rica, and in Florida, Cuba, Hispaniola, the Bahamas, and Turks and Caicos Islands.

Species
There are eight accepted species:
 Lysiloma acapulcense (Kunth) Benth. Mexico to Nicaragua
 Lysiloma auritum (Schltdl.) Benth. southern Mexico to Costa Rica
 Lysiloma candidum Brandegee Baja California Peninsula
 Lysiloma divaricatum (Jacq.) J.F.Macbr. Mexico to Costa Rica
 Lysiloma latisiliquum (L.) Benth. – false tamarind. Southern Mexico, Belize, Cuba, Bahamas, Turks & Caicos, Florida.
 Lysiloma sabicu Benth. – sabicu, horseflesh. southeastern Mexico, Cuba, Hispaniola, Bahamas, Florida
 Lysiloma tergeminum Benth. central and southwestern Mexico
 Lysiloma watsonii Rose – littleleaf false tamarind. Native to southeastern Arizona's Rincon Mountains and in Sonora, Mexico.

Formerly placed here
 Lysiloma ambiguum and L. vogeliana were reclassified as Parasenegalia vogeliana
 Lysiloma polyphyllum was reclassified as Parasenegalia visco

References

External links
 
 

 
Fabaceae genera